An attack submarine or hunter-killer submarine is a submarine specifically designed for the purpose of attacking and sinking other submarines, surface combatants and merchant vessels. In the Soviet and Russian navies they were and are called "multi-purpose submarines". They are also used to protect friendly surface combatants and missile submarines. Some attack subs are also armed with cruise missiles, increasing the scope of their potential missions to include land targets.

Attack submarines may be either nuclear-powered or diesel-electric ("conventionally") powered. In the United States Navy naming system, and in the equivalent NATO system (STANAG 1166), nuclear-powered attack submarines are known as SSNs and their anti-submarine (ASW) diesel-electric predecessors are SSKs. In the US Navy, SSNs are unofficially called "fast attacks".

History

Origins
During World War II, submarines that fulfilled the offensive surface attack role were termed fleet submarines in the U.S. Navy and "ocean-going", "long-patrol", "type 1" or "1st class" by continental European navies.

In the action of 9 February 1945,  sank  while both were at periscope depth. This was the first and so far only intentional sinking of a submerged submarine by a submerged submarine. U-864 was snorkeling, thus producing much noise for Venturers hydrophones (an early form of passive sonar) to detect, and Venturer was fortunate in having over 45 minutes to plot the U-boat's zig-zag course by observing the snorkel mast. Venturers commander, James S. "Jimmy" Launders, was astute in assuming the U-boat would execute an "emergency deep" maneuver once it heard the torpedoes in the water, thus the "spread" of four torpedoes immediately available was aimed on that assumption. One hit, sinking the U-boat.

Beginnings of the attack submarine type

Following World War II, advanced German submarines, especially the Type XXI U-boat, became available to the Allies, particularly the United States Navy and the Soviet Navy. Initially, the Type XVII U-boat, with a Walter hydrogen peroxide-fueled gas turbine allowing high sustained underwater speed, was thought to be more developed than was actually the case, and was viewed as the submarine technology of the immediate future. However, the Type XXI, streamlined and with a high battery capacity for high submerged speed, was fully developed and became the basis for most non-nuclear submarine designs worldwide through the 1950s. In the US Navy, the Greater Underwater Propulsion Power Program (GUPPY) was developed to modernize World War II submarines along the lines of the Type XXI.

Beginnings of a separate hunter-killer submarine type (SSK)

It was realized that the Soviet Union had acquired Type XXI and other advanced U-boats and would soon be putting their own equivalents into production. In 1948 the US Navy prepared estimates of the number of anti-submarine warfare (ASW)-capable submarines that would be needed to counter the hundreds of advanced Soviet submarines that were expected to be in service by 1960. Two scenarios were considered: a reasonable scenario assuming the Soviets would build to their existing force level of about 360 submarines, and a "nightmare" scenario projecting that the Soviets could build submarines as fast as the Germans had built U-boats, with a force level of 2,000 submarines. The projected US SSK force levels for these scenarios were 250 for the former and 970 for the latter. Additional anti-surface (i.e., 'attack'), guided missile, and radar picket submarines would also be needed. By comparison, the total US submarine force at the end of World War II, excluding obsolescent training submarines, was just over 200 boats.

A small submarine suitable for mass production was designed to meet the SSK requirement. This resulted in the three submarines of the K-1 class (later named the Barracuda class), which entered service in 1951. At  surfaced, they were considerably smaller than the  boats produced in World War II. They were equipped with an advanced passive sonar, the bow-mounted BQR-4, but had only four torpedo tubes. Initially, a sonar located around the conning tower was considered, but tests showed that bow-mounted sonar was much less affected by the submarine's own noise.

While developing the purpose-built SSKs, consideration was given to converting World War II submarines into SSKs. The less-capable  was chosen for this, as some of the deeper-diving - and  boats were being upgraded as GUPPYs. Seven Gato-class boats were converted to SSKs in 1951–53. These had the bow-mounted BQR-4 sonar of the other SSKs, with four of the six bow torpedo tubes removed to make room for the sonar and its electronics. The four stern torpedo tubes were retained. Two diesel engines were removed, and the auxiliary machinery was relocated in their place and sound-isolated to reduce the submarine's own noise.

The Soviets took longer than anticipated to start producing new submarines in quantity. By 1952 only ten had entered service. However, production was soon ramped up. By the end of 1960 a total of 320 new Soviet submarines had been built (very close to the USN's 1948 low-end assumption), 215 of them were the Project 613 class (NATO Whiskey class), a smaller derivative of the Type XXI. Significantly, eight of the new submarines were nuclear-powered.

Nuclear era

End of the U.S. conventional hunter-killers (SSK)

, the world's first nuclear submarine, was operational in 1955; the Soviets followed this only three years later with their first Project 627 "Kit"-class SSN (NATO November class). Since a nuclear submarine could maintain a high speed at a deep depth indefinitely, conventional SSKs would be useless against them:

As the development and deployment of nuclear submarines proceeded, in 1957–59 the US Navy's SSKs were decommissioned or redesignated and reassigned to other duties. It had become apparent that all nuclear submarines would have to perform ASW missions.

Other new technologies

 Research proceeded rapidly to maximize the potential of the nuclear submarine for the ASW and other missions. The US Navy developed a fully streamlined hull form and tested other technologies with the conventional , commissioned in 1953. The new hull form was first operationalized with the three conventional  boats and the six nuclear  boats, when both classes entered service beginning in 1959. The  was declared the "world's fastest submarine" following trials, although the actual speed was kept secret.

Sonar research showed that a sonar sphere capable of three-dimensional operation, mounted at the very bow of a streamlined submarine, would increase detection performance. This was recommended by Project Nobska, a 1956 study ordered by Chief of Naval Operations Admiral Arleigh Burke. The one-off  in 1960 and the  starting in 1961 were the first with a bow-mounted sonar sphere; midships torpedo tubes angled outboard were fitted to make room for the sphere.

Failure to develop a U.S. nuclear hunter-killer (SSKN)
Tullibee was a type of nuclear-powered SSK; technologically very successful, intentionally slow but ultra-quiet with turbo-electric drive. Her unexpectedly high cost compared with the Thresher proved it was impossible to build a low-cost nuclear SSK (several nuclear reactor features could not be scaled down beyond a certain point, including radiation shielding). This result coupled with her lower performance was judged to be not cost-effective and the type was not repeated; the Navy decided to merge the hunter-killer role with the attack submarines, making the terms interchangeable. Thresher was faster and had an increased diving depth, carried twice as many torpedoes, included comparable sound silencing improvements, and was commissioned only nine months later.

Thresher'''s loss in April 1963 triggered a major redesign of subsequent US submarines known as the SUBSAFE program. However, Threshers general arrangement and concept were continued in all subsequent US Navy attack submarines.

Later developments
Britain commissioned its first nuclear attack submarine  in 1963.

The first fully streamlined Soviet attack submarines were the Project 671 "Yorsh" class (NATO Victor I class), which first entered service in 1967.

China commissioned its first nuclear attack submarine Changzheng 1 in 1974, and France its first Rubis-class submarine in 1983. Déconstruction : le SNA « Rubis » attendu début 2017 à Cherbourg, le marin.fr

The only time in history that a nuclear attack submarine engaged and sank an enemy warship was in the Falklands War, when on 2 May 1982 the British nuclear submarine  torpedoed and sank the Argentine light cruiser .

As of 2021 Brazil has a nuclear attack submarine under construction, India has finalized a nuclear attack submarine interim design, and Australia has started a nuclear attack submarine program under the AUKUS security pact with UK and US assistance. This article contains quotations from this source, which is available under a Creative Commons Attribution 4.0 International Licence.

Modern conventional submarines

With the advent of air-independent propulsion technology, these submarines have grown more and more capable. Examples include the Type 212,  and  classes of submarine. The US Navy leased  to perform the opposing force role during ASW exercises tactics. The Gotland caused a stir in 2005 when during training it "sank" the American carrier .

Operators

Current operators
  operates six s.
  operates one Type 209 submarine as a pier-side trainer; one  remains in inventory but is inactive.
  operates six s.
  operates two Ming-class submarines.
  operates five Type 209 submarines and three s.
  operates four s.
  operates two Type 209 submarines and two s.
  operates 6 Shang-class submarines, 3 Han-class submarines, 17 Yuan-class submarines, 13 Song-class submarines, 12 s, and 4 Ming-class submarines.
  operates two s, one  and one .
  operates two Type 209 submarines.
  operates two Type 209 submarines.
  operates four Type 209 submarines and four s.
  operates five s and one .
  operates six Type 212 submarines.
  operates four Type 209 submarines, five s, and seven s.
  operates three s and one .
  operates seven Type 209 submarines and four Type 214 submarines.
  operates three s.
  operates six s.
  operates four Type 212 submarines and four s.
  operates 12 s, 9 s, and one .
  operates 20 s.
  operates nine s and eight Type 214 submarines.
  operates two s.
  operates a single , purchased from India, and a single Ming-class submarine purchased from China.
  operates four s.
  operates six s.
  operates five s.
  operates six Type 209 submarines.
  operates one .
  operates two Type 214 submarines.
  possesses a single , though it is not operational.
  operates 10 s, 2 s, two s, c. 21 s (of which nine are the "Improved Kilo" variant), and one .
  operates two s and two s, all purchased from Sweden.
  operates three Type 209 submarines.
  operates two s.
  operates three s and one .
  operates 12 Type 209 submarines.
  operates five s and one .
  operates 26 s, three s, and 21 s.
  operates two Type 209 submarines.
  operates six s.

Former operators

  retired all four of its s in 1989.
  decommissioned its last , Slava'' in 2011.
  retired all three of its s in the 1990s.
  retired its last two s and its lone  in 2005.
  retired its six s from active service in 1984.
  decommissioned its last  in 2006.
  transferred its entire navy to Montenegro upon their independence in 2006.
  retired all three of its s in 1993.
  only submarine, was captured by the Russian Navy during the 2014 Annexation of Crimea.

Former operators (pre-modern attack)

  lost its entire fleet following the Empire's collapse after World War I.
  two s were seized by the Soviet Union in 1940. After Estonia regained independence in 1991, it took back , and was kept in ceremonial commission as the flagship until 2011.
  forced to decommission all five of its submarines following World War II under the Paris Peace Treaty.
  two s were seized by the Soviet Union in 1940.
  decommissioned its last  in 1951.

See also
 List of submarine classes in service
 List of submarine operators

References

Citations

Sources

External links 
 

 
Ship types